Harmony is the ninth studio album by American singer-songwriter Josh Groban. The album was released on November 20, 2020, by Reprise Records.
The deluxe version of the album was released on February 26, 2021 on all platforms.

Track listing

Commercial performance
Harmony debuted at number 17 on the Billboard 200 chart, selling 25,000 units in its first week. In its second week, it dropped to #59, selling a further 14,000 units.

Charts

References

2020 albums
Josh Groban albums
Reprise Records albums